Zabel Point, Brabant Island
 Zabergan Peak, Foyn Coast
 Zabernovo Bastion, Davis Coast
 Mount Zadruga, Oscar II Coast
 Zagore Beach, Livingston Island
 Zagrade Point, Krogh Island  
 Zagreus Ridge, Oscar II Coast
 Zahari Point, Robert Island 
 Zahariev Peak, Oscar II Coast 
 Zaldapa Ridge, Trinity Peninsula 
 Zalmoxis Peak, Sentinel Range 
 Zanoge Hill, Trinity Peninsula
 Zapalnya Cove, Smith Island  
 Zasele Peak, Nordenskjöld Coast  
 Zavala Island, Livingston Island  
 Zavera Snowfield, Trinity Peninsula  
 Zavet Saddle, Smith Island  
 Zavoy Nunatak, Alexander Island
 Zaychar Glacier, Nordenskjöld Coast 
 Zbelsurd Glacier, Liège Island
 Zebil Island, Low Island
 Zelenika Peak, Brabant Island
 Zemen Knoll, Livingston Island
 Zgorigrad Nunatak, Nordenskjöld Coast
 Zhefarovich Crag, Fallières Coast
 Zhelad Saddle, Danco Coast
 Zhelev Peak, Loubet Coast
 Zhelyava Hill, Livingston Island  
 Zhenda Glacier, Sentinel Range
 Zherav Island, Wilhelm Archipelago
 Zheravna Glacier, Greenwich Island  
 Ziezi Peak, Greenwich Island
 Zikoniya Island, Trinity Island
 Zimen Inlet, Oscar II Coast  
 Zimornitsa Peak, Sentinel Range  
 Zimzelen Glacier, Danco Coast  
 Zlatiya Glacier, Brabant Island
 Zlatni Pyasatsi Cove, Elephant Island
 Zlatograd Rock, Livingston Island  
 Zlatolist Hill, Trinity Peninsula  
 Zlidol Gate, Trinity Peninsula 
 Zlogosh Passage, Liège Island 
 Zlokuchene Glacier, Nordenskjöld Coast
 Zmeevo Pass, Sentinel Range
 Znepole Ice Piedmont, Trinity Peninsula  
 Zograf Peak, Livingston Island 
 Zornitsa Cove, Livingston Island  
 Zvegor Saddle, Sentinel Range 
 Zverino Island, Greenwich Island

See also 
 Bulgarian toponyms in Antarctica

External links 
 Bulgarian Antarctic Gazetteer
 SCAR Composite Gazetteer of Antarctica
 Antarctic Digital Database (ADD). Scale 1:250000 topographic map of Antarctica with place-name search.
 L. Ivanov. Bulgarian toponymic presence in Antarctica. Polar Week at the National Museum of Natural History in Sofia, 2–6 December 2019

Bibliography 
 J. Stewart. Antarctica: An Encyclopedia. Jefferson, N.C. and London: McFarland, 2011. 1771 pp.  
 L. Ivanov. Bulgarian Names in Antarctica. Sofia: Manfred Wörner Foundation, 2021. Second edition. 539 pp.  (in Bulgarian)
 G. Bakardzhieva. Bulgarian toponyms in Antarctica. Paisiy Hilendarski University of Plovdiv: Research Papers. Vol. 56, Book 1, Part A, 2018 – Languages and Literature, pp. 104-119 (in Bulgarian)
 L. Ivanov and N. Ivanova. Bulgarian names. In: The World of Antarctica. Generis Publishing, 2022. pp. 114-115. 

Antarctica
 
Bulgarian toponyms in Antarctica
Names of places in Antarctica